The 2017–18 ISU World Standings for single & pair skating and ice dance, are taking into account results of the 2015–16, 2016–17 and 2017–18 seasons. The 2017–18 ISU World standings for synchronized skating, are based on the results of the 2015–16, 2016–17 and 2017–18 seasons.

World Standings for single & pair skating and ice dance

Season-end standings 
The remainder of this section is a complete list, by discipline, published by the ISU.

Men's singles (213 skaters)

Ladies' singles (263 skaters)

Pairs (97 couples)

Ice dance (144 couples)

Season standings

Pairs (78 couples)

Ice dance (105 couples)

World standings for synchronized skating

Season-end standings 
The remainder of this section is a complete list, by level, published by the ISU.

Senior Synchronized (57 teams)

Junior Synchronized (64 teams)

See also 
 ISU World Standings and Season's World Ranking
 2017–18 ISU Season's World Ranking
 List of highest ranked figure skaters by nation
 List of ISU World Standings and Season's World Ranking statistics
 2017–18 figure skating season
 2017–18 synchronized skating season

References

External links 
 International Skating Union
 ISU World standings for Single & Pair Skating and Ice Dance / ISU Season's World Ranking
 ISU World standings for Synchronized Skating

ISU World Standings and Season's World Ranking
Standings and Ranking
Standings and Ranking